Bride & Prejudice (also known as Bride & Prejudice: The Forbidden Weddings) is an Australian reality dating television show which premiered on the Seven Network on 30 January 2017. The series is an adaptation of an American program of the same name which aired for one season in 2016 on FYI, until the program got a second season on Lifetime in 2020. The program follows couples planning to wed, but whose family disapprove of their relationship.

A second season premiered on 29 October 2018 with six new couples. During the second season, a casting call was made for new couples with a third season confirmed for 2019.

A 5-episode British version began broadcasting on Channel 4 on 5 June 2018.

Production
Seven put out a casting call in June 2016 seeking couples in diverse, multicultural or progressive relationships. At the network's upfronts in October 2016, the network announced a "controversial new show" which was still filming at the time, whose format was being kept under wraps because disclosing details and the title of the program could affect participants. It was confirmed in December 2016 that the program was Bride & Prejudice.

Broadcast

American series
The original series began airing on March 15, 2016 on FYI. Like Married at First Sight with its fifth season, the series moved to Lifetime for its second season under the name Bride & Prejudice: Forbidden Love, and premiered on February 26, 2020.

Australian series
The series began airing at 9:00 pm on 30 January 2017. Episode 5 aired out of timeslot on Wednesday, 22 February 2017 as a late replacement due to an episode of Murder Uncovered being pulled from its regular timeslot for legal reasons. The second season debuted on 29 October 2018 and aired two further episodes in the following two days.

Deceased stars
Micah Downey died suddenly on December 28, 2019 at aged 26. The cause of death was down to an overdose of a mix of illegal prescription drugs.
James Ciseau killed in a car crash in Queensland, Australia on November 29, 2021.

Ratings

Season 1 (2017)

Season 2 (2018)

References

2017 Australian television series debuts
2019 Australian television series endings
2010s Australian reality television series
Australian dating and relationship reality television series
English-language television shows
Seven Network original programming
Australian television series based on American television series